Beit T'shuva is a synagogue located in the Russian city of Birobidzhan. The oldest synagogue in the city, having been established in 1986, it is sometimes referred to as "Birobidzhan's old synagogue". While for years, the congregation's religious services included a blend of Christian and Jewish traditions, in 2005, under its leader of many years, Rabbi Boris "Dov" Kaufman, it underwent a transformation to become a "strictly Jewish" synagogue without any Christian influence.

The synagogue, known for its warmth and quaintness, is located in a small Siberian-style wooden house. In 2010, The Christian Science Monitor reported that "nowhere are the ties between Jews and non-Jews here clearer than in Birobidzhan's tiny second synagogue, located on the outskirts of the city." The Monitor went on to convey a scene to back-up its claim:

References

See also
 Birobidzhan Synagogue
 History of the Jews in the Jewish Autonomous Oblast

Synagogues in the Jewish Autonomous Oblast
Birobidzhan
Synagogues in Russia
Synagogues completed in 1986